Siege of Syracuse is a 1960 historical drama film about the Roman Siege of Syracuse, which took place between 213 and 212 B.C., during the Second Punic War with Carthage.

The film was directed by Pietro Francisci.

Cast
Rossano Brazzi as "Archimedes"
Tina Louise as "Diana / Artemide / Lucrezia"
Sylva Koscina as "Clio"
Enrico Maria Salerno as "Gorgia"
Gino Cervi as "Gerone"
Alberto Farnese as "Marcus Claudius Marcellus"
Luciano Marin as "Marco"
Alfredo Varelli as "Kriton"
Walter Grant as "Tiresias"
Mara Lombardo as "Selinonte Dancer"

Reception 
Dave Sindelar called the film "un-even". The film was criticized for a lack of historical accuracy.

See also
List of historical drama films
List of films set in ancient Rome

References

External links

Films set in ancient Rome
1960 films
Films set in classical antiquity
Peplum films
Films set in Sicily
1960s historical films
Films set in the 3rd century BC
Films directed by Pietro Francisci
Films set in the Mediterranean Sea
Siege films
Cultural depictions of Archimedes
Films scored by Angelo Francesco Lavagnino
Sword and sandal films
Second Punic War films
1960s Italian-language films
1960s Italian films